The National Association of Pastoral Care in Education (NAPCE) is a registered charity in the United Kingdom. It runs the National Pastoral Care Awards annually for UK schools.

Pastoral Care in Education
NAPCE produce four issues of Pastoral Care in Education every year, an international journal publishing research on personal, social and emotional development across the curriculum.

References

External links
 Official website

Charities based in England
Nuneaton